Erika L F. Holzbaur (born 1960) is an American biologist who is the William Maul Measey Professor of Physiology at University of Pennsylvania Perelman School of Medicine. Her research considers the dynamics of organelle motility along cytoskeleton of cells. She is particularly interested in the molecular mechanisms that underpin neurodegenerative diseases.

Early life and education 
Holzbaur grew up in Poughkeepsie, New York. She became interested in American history as a teenager, and in particular was inspired by the women's rights advocate Frederick Douglass. As an undergraduate student, Holzbaur majored in history, but became fascinated by the periodic table and chemistry. She eventually graduated from the College of William & Mary with a major in chemistry and history. She completed an undergraduate research project with Melvyn Schiavelli. Holzbaur has said that she became interested in cell biology during her interviews for graduate school. Her doctoral research at the University of Pennsylvania involved studies of the ATPase pathway of axonemal dynein. She worked as a postdoctoral researcher at Pennsylvania State University and the Worcester Foundation for Biomedical Research. During her postdoctoral research, Holzbaur studied cytoplasmic dynein. She was the first person to clone the p150Glued, the largest subunit of the dynactin complex, and went on to show how this subunit binds to microtubules. She recognized that the cytoplasmic dynein-associated proteins closely resembled a Drosophila gene called Glued, which was known to cause neurodegeneration in the fruit-fly.

Research and career 
Holzbaur's research considers the dynamics of organelle motility along cytoskeleton of cells. She was appointed to the faculty at the University of Pennsylvania in 1992. Holzbaur studies various motor proteins, including dyneins, myosins and kinesins. In the axons of neurons, these motor proteins are responsible for the transport of organelles over extraordinarily long distances. She found that targeted disruption of the dynein-dynctin interaction can result in the degeneration of motor neurons. Holzbaur has used her understanding of axonal transport to better understand neurodegenerative disease, including Parkinson's disease and amyotrophic lateral sclerosis.

Awards and honors 
 Pfizer Award for Research Excellence
 William Maul Measey Endowed Professor
 Fellow of the American Society for Cell Biology
 Jane M. Glick Teaching Award
 National Institutes of Health Javits Neuroscience Investigator Award
 Keith R. Porter Fellowship Award
 Sandra K. Masur Senior Leadership Award
 American Heart Association Established Investigator

Selected publications

References 

1961 births
21st-century American biologists
University of Pennsylvania faculty
College of William & Mary alumni
Pennsylvania State University alumni
Living people
People from Poughkeepsie, New York